Sphenomorphus mimikanus  is a species of skink found in New Guinea.

References

mimikanus
Reptiles described in 1914
Taxa named by George Albert Boulenger
Skinks of New Guinea